Musa Çelebi (died 5 July 1413) was an Ottoman prince and a co-ruler of the empire for three years during the Ottoman Interregnum.

Background 

Musa was one of the sons of Bayezid I, the fourth Ottoman sultan. There is no consensus about his mother's origin; she was either the daughter of the bey of the Turkish Germiyanids or a Byzantine princess. After the Battle of Ankara, in which Bayezid I was defeated by Tamerlane, Musa and Bayezıd were taken prisoners of war by Tamerlane. However, after Bayezıd's death in 1403, he was released. He returned to the Ottoman Empire, which was now in turmoil, and tried to access the throne in Bursa, the Anatolian capital of the empire in 1403. However, three of his brothers were also claimants to the Ottoman throne: İsa Çelebi in Balıkesir and Mehmet Çelebi in Amasya (both in the Anatolian portion of the empire), Süleyman Çelebi in Edirne, the Rumeli (European) capital. (the Ottoman Empire at the time had two capitals, since the declining Byzantine Empire in Constantinople separated the two parts of the Ottoman lands).

Ottoman Interregnum 

İsa defeated Musa and captured Bursa. Musa took refuge in Germiyanid territory, where he waited for a suitable moment to try again. In 1406, Mehmet, who had defeated İsa, became the sole ruler of the Anatolian portion of the empire, but he was no match for Süleyman of the Rumeli (European) portion. Mehmet and Musa met in Kırşehir in central Anatolia and formed an alliance against Süleyman. Most of the beyliks in Anatolia also supported this alliance. According to the terms of the alliance, Musa was transferred to the European part over the Black Sea where he allied himself with Mircea of Wallachia. Süleyman now had to fight on two fronts, against Mehmet in Anatolia and against Musa in Europe. This strategy was partially successful, as Süleyman gave up his hopes to conquer the Anatolian portion of the empire. However, he was able to defeat Musa at the battles of Kosmidion and Edirne. Despite his defeat, Musa continued with hit-and-run tactics against Süleyman up until 1410. Meanwhile, Süleyman had lost most of his previous allies due to his uncontrollable temper. In 1411, Musa's tactics finally gave victory and he captured Edirne. The defeated Süleyman, while attempting to escape into Byzantine territories, was killed by villagers on 18 February 1411, and Musa found himself as the co-sultan of the empire.

As a co-sultan 

The details of the previous Mehmet–Musa alliance are not clear. Musa declared himself the sultan of the European portion of the empire, while Mehmet viewed Musa as his vassal. Musa besieged Byzantine Constantinople (modern Istanbul) as retribution for Manuel II Palaiologos's support for Süleyman during the previous battles between Musa and Süleyman. Manuel II Palaiologos turned to Mehmet for support, who betrayed Musa and set up a new alliance between himself and the Byzantines against Musa.

In 1411 and in 1412, Mehmet's forces clashed with Musa's, and in both cases Mehmet was defeated. In 1413, Mehmet gained the support of Serbian monarch Stefan Lazarević and the bey of the Turkish Dulkadirids, as well as some of the generals in Musa's army. He defeated Musa's forces in the Battle of Çamurlu near Samaku (today Samokov, Bulgaria). Injured and trying to escape, Musa was spotted and killed on 5 July 1413.

Aftermath 

Musa's death ended the Ottoman Interregnum. His brother Mehmet Çelebi became Sultan Mehmet I. However, in 1416, Sheikh Bedreddin, one of Musa's former allies (chief military judge, the kazasker), led an unsuccessful revolt against Mehmet I. Other events that may be viewed as the continuation of the interregnum were the two rebellions of Düzmece Mustafa Çelebi, another one of Beyazıt's sons who had been hiding in Anatolia. Mustafa was a fifth claimant to throne and he fought against both his brother Mehmet in 1416 and his nephew Murat II in 1421 unsuccessfully.

Family
Musa married two times:
A daughter of Mircea I of Wallachia, married in 1403;
A daughter of Carlo I Tocco, married in 1412;

References

1413 deaths
15th-century people from the Ottoman Empire
Ottoman princes
Assassinated people from the Ottoman Empire
Year of birth unknown
People of the Ottoman Interregnum
Pretenders to the Ottoman throne